Grace D. O'Connell is an American biomechanical engineer known for her research on the biomechanics of the human spine, on the degeneration and regeneration of spinal tissue, and on the comparison of its properties with the spines of animals used in the study of lumbar disc disease. She is an associate professor of mechanical engineering at the University of California, Berkeley, where she also holds the Don M. Cunningham Chair in Mechanical Engineering.

Education and career
O'Connell was a high school student at Upper Darby High School in Pennsylvania. After being inspired by a high school engineering class, and also taking flying lessons as a high school student, O'Connell began an aerospace engineering program at Virginia Tech and then transferred to the University of Maryland, College Park, graduating in 2004. She earned a Ph.D. in bioengineering in 2009 from the University of Pennsylvania, supervised by Dawn Elliott. 

She was a postdoctoral researcher with Clark Hung at Columbia University from 2009 to 2013 before joining the University of California, Berkeley faculty.
She has also held an adjunct faculty position in the Department of Orthopaedic Surgery at the University of California, San Francisco since 2017. At Berkeley, she was promoted to a tenured associate professorship in 2019. In 2021 she was named as associate dean for inclusive excellence in the UC Berkeley College of Engineering.

Activism
O'Connell is a member of the National Society of Black Engineers and the Society of Women Engineers. As a woman of color in engineering, she has been sensitive to the challenges faced by minorities in engineering and has worked to improve the diversity of the field. Her work in this area has included serving as an advisor for the Berkeley Society of Women Engineers and Black Engineering and Science Student Association, and leading the Berkeley Girls in Engineering Program.

Recognition
O'Connell was the 2019 recipient of the Y. C. Fung Young Investigator Award of the American Society of Mechanical Engineers, named for her "pioneering work in multiscale mechanics of musculoskeletal soft tissues". She was named as a Fellow of the American Institute for Medical and Biological Engineering in 2021 "for outstanding contributions to understanding biomechanical degeneration and failure of fiber-reinforced biological tissues by creating integrated computational and experimental approaches".

Upper Darby High School named her to their alumni wall of fame in 2021.

References

External links
O'Connell Lab

Year of birth missing (living people)
Living people
American biomedical engineers
American mechanical engineers
American women engineers
African-American engineers
African-American women engineers
Women bioengineers
University of Maryland, College Park alumni
University of Pennsylvania alumni
University of California, Berkeley faculty
Fellows of the American Institute for Medical and Biological Engineering